Potapenko is a Ukrainian surname.  Notable people with the surname include:

Gennady Potapenko (1894–1979), American radio astronomer
Ignaty Potapenko (1856–1929), Russian writer and playwright
Oleksiy Potapenko, or Potap (born 1981), Ukrainian singer, composer and producer
 Sergei Potapenko (born 1963), Belarusian Military leader, Deputy Minister of Defense
Vasyl' Potapenko (1886–1934), Ukrainian guide-boy for kobzar Tereshko Parkhomenko and bandurist
Vitaly Potapenko (born 1975), Ukrainian basketball player who played in the National Basketball Association

See also
 

Ukrainian-language surnames